Danny Roberts may refer to:

 Danny Roberts (Australian actor) (born 1966)
 Danny Roberts (footballer) (born 1975), English footballer
 Danny Roberts (fighter) (born 1987), British mixed martial artist
 Danny Roberts (The Real World) (born 1977), appeared on The Real World: New Orleans in 2000

See also
Daniel Roberts (disambiguation)